Antoninus (died 186) was a public executioner in Rome. It is believed that during the trial of St Eusebius he had a vision and converted to Christianity. The proclamation of faith cost him his life and he was beheaded in 186. His feast day is 22 August.

References

Saints from Roman Italy
2nd-century Christian martyrs
186 deaths
Year of birth unknown